Robert Sylvester "Buzz" Murphy (April 26, 1895 – May 11, 1938) was a Major League Baseball outfielder.

External links

Major League Baseball outfielders
Boston Braves players
Washington Senators (1901–1960) players
York Prohibitionists players
Marshalltown Ansons players
Des Moines Boosters players
Minneapolis Millers (baseball) players
Baseball players from Denver
1895 births
1938 deaths